Grace and Danger is the eighth studio album by John Martyn, released on October 13, 1980 by Island Records.

Background
The album was written and recorded while John Martyn was in the process of divorcing his wife Beverley, and the songs strongly reflect the emotional upheaval that he was experiencing at the time.  Martyn and Phil Collins forged a close friendship during the writing and recording of the album with both musicians going through painful divorces at the time - Collins played drums and provided backing vocals. In fact a strong kinship exists between Grace And Danger and Collins' contemporaneous album Face Value, which also contained a strong narrative relating to relationship breakdown.  The release of the album was delayed by Island Records for well over a year because Chris Blackwell, the label owner (and friend of both John and Beverley) found the album too depressing. Producer Martin Levan said of the delay that "the messages I was getting back was that Chris [Blackwell] felt it was too sad and he didn't want to put it out. He felt it too depressing and didn't want it released." Speaking in 1981, Martyn captured his frustration at the situation, "I freaked: 'Please get it out! I don't give a damn how sad it makes you feel - It's what I'm about: direct communication of emotion.'"

When released, Rolling Stone described the album as "a very strong outing for John Martyn, placing him in a class with such intelligent eclectics as Joan Armatrading and Joni Mitchell." Grace and Danger was released in a deluxe edition in February 2007, which featured the original album remastered, with a second CD of demos and offcuts. The BBC Scotland programme Scotland's Music, presented by Phil Cunningham included a performance of "Hurt In Your Heart" by Martyn during its November 2007 episode "Love & Loss". It was voted number 327 in Colin Larkin's All Time Top 1000 Albums 3rd Edition (2000). In the book he stated “Martyn shared the break-up of his marriage to Beverly with us, tearing open his heart and exposing all his emotions on record." 
The album cover was created by UK photographer/artist Sandy Porter.

Track listing

Deluxe edition track listing

Disc 1
"Some People Are Crazy"  – 4:19
"Grace and Danger"  – 4:02
"Lookin' On"   – 5:11
"Johnny Too Bad" – 3:56
"Sweet Little Mystery"  – 5:28
"Hurt In Your Heart" – 4:58
"Baby Please Come Home"  – 3:56
"Save Some (For Me)"  – 3:34
"Our Love" – 3:57
"Sweet Little Mystery" (Old Grey Whistle Test performance, 10/01/81) - 4:56
"Lookin' On" (Old Grey Whistle Test performance, 10/01/81) - 5:10
"Some People Are Crazy" (Rock Goes To College performance, 02/03/81) - 4:19
"Grace and Danger" (Rock Goes To College performance, 02/03/81) - 4:25
"Save Some (For Me)" (Rock Goes To College performance, 02/03/81) - 3:34

Disc 2
"Small Hat"
"Johnny Too Bad" (First version)
"Running Up The Harbour"
"Sweet Little Mystery" (First version)
"Dead On Arrival"
"Some People Are Crazy" (First version)
"Baby Please Come Home" (First version)
"Grace And Danger" (First version)
"Hurt In Your Heart" (Instrumental)
"After Tomorrow Night"
"Our Love" (First version)
"Lilo Blondino"
"Johnny Too Bad" (Dub mix)

Tracks 1-12 from CD2 recorded at Basing Street Studios, London, 29 March 1979. Tracks 4-6 were mixed there 4 June 1979. The rest 9 June 1979.

Personnel
Original album
John Martyn - guitar, vocals
Tommy Eyre - keyboards, synthesizers
John Giblin - bass
Phil Collins - drums, backing vocals
Dave Lawson - additional synthesizers on "Some People Are Crazy", "Sweet Little Mystery" and "Baby Please Come Home"
Other musicians, Deluxe Edition
Alan Thomson - bass on Disc 1, tracks 10-14
Danny Cummings - percussion on Disc 1, tracks 10-14
Jeff Allen - drums on Disc 1, tracks 12-14
Technical
Martin Levan - producer, engineer
Mark Freegard - assistant engineer
Bruno Tilley - design
Sandy Porter - photography

References

External links
The Official John Martyn Website

John Martyn albums
1980 albums
Island Records albums